N-acetylmuramic acid 6-phosphate etherase (MurNAc-6-P etherase, MurQ) is an enzyme with systematic name (R)-lactate hydro-lyase (adding N-acetyl-D-glucosamine 6-phosphate; N-acetylmuramate 6-phosphate-forming). This enzyme catalyses the following chemical reaction

 (R)-lactate + N-acetyl-D-glucosamine 6-phosphate  N-acetylmuramate 6-phosphate + H2O

This enzyme is required for the utilization of anhydro-N-acetylmuramic acid in some Pseudomonadota.

References

External links 
 

EC 4.2.1